Tangal-e Shur-e Olya (also Romanized as Tangal-e Shūr-e ‘Olyā; also known as Tangal-e Shūr-e Bālā, Tangal-e Shūr, and Shahrak-e Qā'im) is a village in Meyami Rural District, Razaviyeh District, Mashhad County, Razavi Khorasan Province, Iran. At the 2006 census, its population was 1,527, in 362 families.

References 

Populated places in Mashhad County